The following is a list of Kansas City Roos men's basketball head coaches. There have been 12 head coaches of the Roos in their 53-season history.

Kansas City's current head coach is Marvin Menzies. He was hired as the Roos' head coach in April 2022, replacing Billy Donlon, who left to join the coaching staff at Clemson.

References

Kansas City

Kansas City Roos basketball, men's, coaches